Jovan Šljivančanin (born 16 February 1999) is a Serbian professional basketball player for Minsk of the Belarusian Premier League and the VTB United League. He played college basketball for the Carroll College Fighting Saints.

Early career 
Šljivančanin grew up playing basketball in Belgrade for youth systems of Partizan and Beovuk before he moved to Las Vegas, U.S. at age 16.

College career 
Šljivančanin played college basketball for the Carroll College Fighting Saints from 2018 to 2022. He graduated with a business management degree. As a senior, he averaged 19.5 points, 10.9 rebounds, and 3.3 assists per game. He racked up 20 double-doubles in his final season, finishing with 52 for his career. Šljivančanin was tabbed first team All-American, becoming just the fifth Carroll men's basketball player to do so, and earned Frontier Conference Player of the Year honors.

Šljivančanin finished his career ranked fifth on the all-time scoring list with 1,940 points. He pulled down over 1,100 career rebounds, shot better than 47% from the field, and averaged 15.3 points, nine rebounds and 2.4 assists per game in his four years at Carroll. Also, Carroll won two regular-season championships with him on the roster and played in four consecutive Frontier Tournament Championship games. Carroll qualified for the NAIA Men's Basketball Championships all four years, advancing to the championship game his freshman year and to the quarterfinals his junior season.

Professional career 
In July 2022, Šljivančanin signed a contract with Mega Basket. On 2 December 2022, Šljivančanin signed for Minsk.

References

External links 
 Jovan Sljivancanin at carrollathletics.com
 Profile at realgm.com
 Profile at eurobasket.com
 Jovan Sljivancanin at aba-liga.com
 Jovan Sljivancanin at proballers.com
 Jovan Sljivancanin at ESPN

1999 births
Living people
Basketball players from Belgrade
BC Tsmoki-Minsk players
Carroll College (Montana) alumni
Junior college men's basketball players in the United States
Serbian expatriate basketball people in Belarus
Serbian expatriate basketball people in the United States
Serbian men's basketball players
Shooting guards
Small forwards
KK Mega Basket players